Addition and Subtraction is a 1900 French short silent film directed by Georges Méliès. It was released by Méliès's Star Film Company and is numbered 234 in its catalogues.

Méliès plays the magician in the film. The other actors in the film have not been positively identified, but the film historian Georges Sadoul, analyzing a production still in which the film's three women are posed in a group, believed Jeanne Mareyla to be the woman in the center.

References

External links

 

1900 films
French silent short films
French black-and-white films
Films directed by Georges Méliès
Films about magic
Silent horror films
1900s French films